Shéyaa Bin Abraham-Joseph (born October 22, 1992), known professionally as 21 Savage, is a rapper based in Atlanta, Georgia, United States. Born in London, he moved to Atlanta with his mother at age seven. He became known after releasing two mixtapes in 2015, before attaining international attention with the release of the collaborative EP Savage Mode (2016) with Metro Boomin; its singles "X" (featuring Future) and "No Heart" peaked within the top 40 on the Billboard Hot 100 and 21 Savage's profile also later increased with a guest feature on Drake's 2016 single "Sneakin'". He then signed a recording contract with Epic Records in January 2017.

21 Savage's debut studio album, Issa Album (2017), peaked at number two on the U.S. Billboard 200 and its lead single "Bank Account" reached number 12 on the Hot 100. He then released the collaborative album Without Warning (2017) with Offset and Metro Boomin, with the song "Ric Flair Drip" peaking at number 13 on the Hot 100, though that particular song did not feature him. 21 Savage featured on Post Malone's 2017 single "Rockstar", which reached number one on the Hot 100 and nominated for Record of the Year and Best Rap/Sung Performance at the 2019 Grammy Awards.  His second album, I Am > I Was (2018), became his first U.S. number one album and spawned the hit song "A Lot" (featuring J. Cole), which won Best Rap Song at the 2020 Grammy Awards. 21 Savage's highly anticipated third album, Savage Mode II (2020), a sequel collaboration with Metro Boomin to their 2016 EP, debuted atop the Billboard 200, and spawned the U.S. top 10 singles "Runnin" and "Mr. Right Now" (featuring Drake). In 2022, 21 Savage would be featured on Drake's song "Jimmy Cooks" from his album Honestly, Nevermind, where it debuted at number one on the Hot 100, making it 21 Savage's second number one on the chart and his first number-one debut.

21 Savage was arrested by U.S. Immigration and Customs Enforcement (ICE) on February 3, 2019. Officials revealed his status as a British citizen who entered the U.S. in July 2005 and unlawfully overstayed a H-4 visa that expired in 2006. He was granted bond on February 12 and released the next day, pending the outcome of an expedited deportation hearing, which was initially scheduled for April 9, but was later postponed indefinitely, with 21 Savage's lawyers stating he was legally residing in the U.S. for several years prior to the 2005 H-4 visa.

Early life
Shéyaa Bin Abraham-Joseph was born on October 22, 1992, at Newham University Hospital in the Plaistow area of London, the son of Heather Carmillia Joseph and Kevin Cornelius Emmons. His parents are both British nationals with Caribbean origins; his mother's family is from Dominica, and his father's is from Saint Vincent and the Grenadines, while his paternal grandfather was Haitian. His father and twin sisters, dance choreographers Kyra and Jayda Davis, continue to live in London, where his father works for Westminster City Council. 

Abraham-Joseph's parents separated early in his life, and he moved at age seven with his mother to Atlanta, Georgia. In June 2005, at the age of 12, he returned to the United Kingdom for his uncle's funeral, stayed for a month, and then went back to Atlanta on an H-4 visa on July 22, 2005, which allegedly expired a year later. Abraham-Joseph's mother then began a relationship with Dr. Amsu Anpu, an endocrinologist and British expatriate, with whom she had more children. He had a brother Quantivayus ("Tay-Man") who died in a shooting after an attempted drug deal.

In seventh grade, Abraham-Joseph was banned permanently from every school in DeKalb County School District for gun possession. This led him to begin attending schools around the Atlanta metropolitan area before being sent to a juvenile detention center. After being released from the juvenile detention center, he completed eighth grade through an alternative program before finishing a semester of high school, but dropped out in his freshman year following multiple exclusions that he said "exhausted" him. After dropping out, he joined a local street gang affiliated with the wider Bloods gang and became a full-time drug dealer, mainly selling cannabis. He also regularly took part in other criminal activities including robbery and car theft, although he was only arrested once after contraband was found in a car he was driving. In 2011, when he was 19, his "right-hand man" Larry was killed in a shootout. In 2013, during an attempted robbery on his 21st birthday, Abraham-Joseph was shot six times by rival gang members and his best friend Johnny was killed.

Career

2014–2015: Early releases, The Slaughter Tape, and Slaughter King
Following the death of his friend in a shootout on his 21st birthday, 21 Savage began rapping. His music career was originally subsidized by his deceased friend's uncle, who gave him money for studio time in 2013. On November 12, 2014, 21 Savage's debut single, "Picky", produced by DJ Plugg, was released. It was later included on his debut mixtape, The Slaughter Tape, which was released on May 25, 2015. The release made him what Interview Magazine called an "underground hero in Atlanta".

On July 2, 2015, 21 Savage released a collaborative EP, Free Guwop, with Sonny Digital. It is a tribute EP to fellow rapper and influence Gucci Mane. On December 1, 2015, 21 Savage released his second mixtape, Slaughter King.

2016–2017: Savage Mode, Issa Album, and Without Warning

In June 2016, 21 Savage was named as one of the "Freshman Class" of 2016 by XXL. On July 15, 2016, 21 Savage released his joint EP Savage Mode with Atlanta-based record producer Metro Boomin. The EP gained international success and peaked at number 23 on the Billboard 200, which became their highest charting EP to date. In November 2016, he was on the cover of The Fader. The Savage Mode single "X" featuring Future was confirmed by Billboard as going platinum in the US, being 21 Savage's first platinum record. On January 18, 2017, 21 Savage announced that he had signed to Epic Records.

In 2017, his debut studio album, Issa Album, debuted at number two on the US Billboard 200. Its lead single, "Bank Account", peaked at number 12 on the Billboard Hot 100. Later that year, he was featured on Post Malone's single "Rockstar", which peaked at number one on the Billboard Hot 100 and broke numerous records. It became 21 Savage's first number-one song and was later certified Diamond by the RIAA.

On October 31, 2017, a collaborative studio album by 21 Savage, Offset, and Metro Boomin titled Without Warning was released. Without Warning debuted at number four on the US Billboard 200 and received generally positive reviews from critics. Its lead single, "Ric Flair Drip" peaked at number 13 on the Billboard Hot 100.

2018–19: I Am > I Was

In April 2018, 21 Savage had a guest appearance on Young Thug's extended play Hear No Evil along with fellow rappers Nicki Minaj and Lil Uzi Vert. Later that month, he also appeared on the single "Outstanding" by SahBabii. On March 21, 2018, he was featured on the single "Rover 2.0", which is part of BlocBoy JB's Simi mixtape. In the following month, he was featured on Ty Dolla Sign's "Clout", which was part of the deluxe edition of his album Beach House 3.

On October 31, 2018, 21 Savage posted on his Instagram a picture of a man in silhouette jumping in the air in the direction away from a large blaze. In the bottom right corner of the picture there was a "Parental Advisory" notice, as there oftentimes is on the cover of rap releases. 21 Savage also tagged Metro Boomin in the post. For these reasons, some speculated it to be a sequel to 2017's Without Warning album. However, it turned out to be the cover for Metro's debut solo album, Not All Heroes Wear Capes.

On December 6, 2018, 21 Savage posted cover art for his album, I Am > I Was, on Instagram, which features a blurred out image of himself, captioning the image with a number of goat emojis. The next day, 21 Savage took to Twitter and his Instagram story to apologize that he "forgot" to release the album, saying on Twitter: "Dam I forgot to drop my album my bad y'all". He announced a new date of December 21, 2018. The track-list was leaked by record producer Louis Bell via his Instagram story on December 13, 2018. 21 Savage released his second studio album I Am > I Was on December 21, 2018, with features from Travis Scott, Post Malone, Childish Gambino, Offset, J. Cole, Gunna, Lil Baby, Project Pat, Yung Miami, and Schoolboy Q. None of those acts, however, are credited as artists on the album. I Am > I Was debuted at number one on the US Billboard 200, earning 131,000 album-equivalent units (including 18,000 pure album sales), making it 21 Savage's first US number one album. It was led by "A Lot", featuring vocals from J. Cole. The song peaked at number 12 on the US Billboard Hot 100 and earned 21 Savage his first Grammy award. Through 2019, 21 Savage released only one song named "Immortal".

2020–present: Savage Mode II,  Spiral soundtrack, and Her Loss

In February 2020, 21 Savage and longtime collaborator Metro Boomin hinted at the release of a sequel to their Savage Mode extended play called Savage Mode II. On September 28, 2020, a teaser trailer for Savage Mode II, directed by Gibson Hazard was released, with a narration from Morgan Freeman, announcing the release date of October 2. The collaborative album peaked at number one on the Billboard 200 and included two top-ten singles, "Runnin", and "Mr. Right Now", featuring Drake.

21 Savage was featured alongside Justin Bieber on DJ Khaled's April 2021-released single "Let It Go" from Khaled's twelfth studio album, Khaled Khaled. On May 14, 2021, he released an EP titled Spiral, serving as the official soundtrack to the film Spiral: From the Book of Saw. The same day, he was featured on the track "My Life" off of J. Cole's sixth studio album, The Off-Season. The track peaked at number two on the Billboard Hot 100.

Drake announced a collaboration studio album with 21 Savage, Her Loss, releasing on November 4, 2022.

Musical style
Called "one of the last real street niggas left making music" by frequent collaborator Metro Boomin, 21 Savage's music is heavily autobiographic with an emphasis on violent and criminal aspects of his past, including murder and drug dealing. Vocally, he is known for his "trademark villainous monotone drawl". His musical style is influenced by Three 6 Mafia.

Philanthropy
In early August 2016, 2017, 2018, and 2019, 21 Savage hosted the "Issa Back to School Drive" (named after his album Issa Album) in his home neighborhood in Atlanta. The drive gave free haircuts, hairstyles, supplies, and school uniforms.

In March 2018, 21 Savage announced the creation of the 21 Savage Bank Account Campaign (named after his hit song "Bank Account") on The Ellen DeGeneres Show, he also announced that he was donating $21,000 to the cause. He stated, "I started the 21 Savage Bank Account Campaign and it's to help kids learn how to save money and make money, and open bank accounts for kids." Four months later, he donated $10,000 to Atlanta's Continental Colony Elementary School to fund an anti-bullying campaign.

On July 1, 2020, 21 Savage announced he was launching a free online financial literacy education program for kids and teenagers stuck at home during the COVID-19 pandemic, saying, "I feel like it's important more than ever to give our next generation the tools to succeed in life." The program includes a partnership with Atlanta mayor Keisha Lance Bottoms to provide free tablets and WiFi to underserved students in Atlanta.

Personal life
21 Savage and his mother are both adherents of the traditional West African religion Ifá. In June 2017, he started dating model Amber Rose, but had separated in May 2018.

In October 2017, he began taking flying lessons in a Cirrus SR20 single-engine aircraft.

In November 2020, 21 Savage's half brother, Terrell Davis ("TM1Way"), was stabbed to death in Lambeth, London.

He is a fan of English Premier League team Arsenal.

Legal issues and controversies

Drug conviction
21 Savage was convicted of felony drug charges in October 2014 in Fulton County, Georgia.

Weapons
In 2018, 21 Savage reportedly started a movement called "Guns Down, Paintballs Up" which was intended to reduce gun violence by suggesting the use of paintball guns instead of lethal firearms. The head of the Detroit Police Department, James Craig, described the movement as "well-intentioned, however, misguided", after several incidents involving paintball guns later resulted in injuries, disorderly conduct involving large groups of people with paintball guns, property vandalism (e.g., of police vehicles), violent reprisals, and the mistaking of paintball guns for firearms. The movement has been linked to several cases of property crime and homicide. 21 Savage has not commented on the matter, although he paid for the funeral of a 3-year-old who was killed in a related incident.

Controversy arose after 21 Savage pulled out a firearm during a pool party on June 10, 2018. 21 Savage had been given the firearm by a friend after seeing an opposing crew member also pull out a pistol.

Lyrics
"ASMR", a song from 21 Savage's second studio album I Am > I Was, caused some controversy with its lyrics. The lyrics included the line, "We been gettin' that Jewish money, everything is kosher." The lyrics came under fire for perpetuating negative Jewish stereotypes when LeBron James shared an Instagram story quoting the track. 21 Savage later apologized, saying on Twitter, "The Jewish people I know are very wise with there  money so that's why I said we been gettin' Jewish money. I never thought anyone would take offense, I'm sorry if I offended everybody, never my intention I love all people with all my heart."

Arrest on immigration charges
On February 3, 2019, just two days after releasing the music video for his single "A Lot", 21 Savage was taken into custody by the U.S. Immigration and Customs Enforcement (ICE) after a vehicle was pulled over that contained him and his cousin, Young Nudy, and two other men. Young Nudy and the two other men had been targeted in an operation involving charges of aggravated assault and violation of the Georgia Gang Act.
21 Savage later alleged that he was personally also targeted in the operation.
After his arrest, ICE revealed that 21 Savage is a British national who has been in the United States unlawfully since his non-immigrant visa expired in July 2006. 21 Savage's management team expresses he has been trying to get his Visa renewed since the year 2017. Before this, 21 Savage had commonly been believed to be a native of the Atlanta area – e.g., Interview magazine had reported in an interview with Seth Rogen in April 2018 that the rapper's birthplace was Atlanta, Georgia, and in a 2016 interview with XXL Magazine, he said he was "from Decatur, Georgia" (which is in the Atlanta metropolitan area).

A spokesperson for ICE said of 21 Savage, "His whole public persona is false. He actually came to the U.S. from the U.K. as a teen and overstayed his visa." A birth certificate then surfaced showing that 21 Savage was born in Newham, London on October 22, 1992, which indicates that he had been 12 years old in July 2005 – not "a teen."  Moreover, he had first entered the U.S. at the age of 7, only leaving in 2005 to attend his uncle's funeral and re-entering that same year. His attorney acknowledged that 21 Savage had overstayed the expired visa, but said that he had not attempted to hide his background, and said that the Department of Homeland Security had been aware that in 2017 he had applied for a U visa a type of non-immigrant visa offered to crime victims and their family members who are willing to assist law enforcement officials in the investigation or prosecution of criminal activity.

21 Savage has been released from ICE's custody; however, his case is still pending. He is allowed to move around the US, but cannot travel abroad.

Theft by deception charges
On February 15, 2019, 21 Savage turned himself in to authorities and was booked into a south Georgia jail in response to a warrant for his arrest for felony theft by deception. This dispute surrounds a gig arranged in 2016 for which the rapper allegedly accepted a payment of $17,000 to appear at a concert, but did not appear and did not give back the money. He was released on his own recognizance, pending a court hearing on a later date to resolve the charge.

Feuds
In early 2020, a feud between 21 Savage and American producer Young Chop arose after Chop insulted 21 Savage on an Instagram livestream. On April 6, while reportedly taking an Uber in 21 Savage's neighborhood in an attempt to find where he lived, Chop stated that an unknown gunman fired at his car, but he was not injured. No other sources have confirmed whether or not this story is true and no gunshots were captured on the video in which he made the accusation.

Lawsuits 
In November 2022, 21 Savage and Drake were sued by Condé Nast, the publisher of Vogue magazine, for using the Vogue name without permission to promote their collaborative album Her Loss.

Discography

Studio albums

Issa Album (2017)
I Am > I Was (2018)

Collaborative albums
Without Warning  (2017)
Savage Mode II  (2020)
 Her Loss  (2022)

Filmography
In 2017, it was reported that 21 Savage was guest starred in the movie The Trap and working on his debut film, Issa Movie.

21 Savage has also worked on a YouTube animated mini-series named Year 2100.

Tours
Headlining
 Issa Tour (2017)
 Numb the Pain Tour (2017)
 I Am > I Was Tour (2019)

Co-headlining
 The Off-Season Tour (2021) 
 It's All A Blur Tour (2023) 

Opening act
 HiHorse'd Tour (2016) 
 Beerbongs & Bentleys Tour (2018)

Awards and nominations

See also
 List of artists who reached number one on the UK Singles Chart

References

External links
 
 

1992 births
Black British male rappers
Bloods
British emigrants to the United States
English people of Dominica descent
English people of Saint Vincent and the Grenadines descent
British people of Haitian descent
Living people
People from Plaistow, Newham
Rappers from Atlanta
Rappers from London
Southern hip hop musicians
Grammy Award winners for rap music
Epic Records artists
Trap musicians